The 1982 Utah Utes football team was an American football team that represented the University of Utah as a member of the Western Athletic Conference (WAC) during the 1982 NCAA Division I-A football season. In their first season under head coach Chuck Stobart, the Utes compiled an overall record of 5–6 with a mark of 2–4 against conference opponents, placing seventh in the WAC. Home games were played on campus at Robert Rice Stadium in Salt Lake City.

Schedule

References

Utah
Utah Utes football seasons
Utah Utes football